One Quiet Night is a 1931 American comedy film directed by Fatty Arbuckle, and starring Walter Catlett and Dorothy Granger.

See also
 Fatty Arbuckle filmography

External links

1931 films
1931 comedy films
1931 short films
Educational Pictures short films
American black-and-white films
Films directed by Roscoe Arbuckle
American comedy short films
Films with screenplays by Jack Townley
1930s English-language films
1930s American films